Lassina Chamste Soudine Franck Traoré (born 12 January 2001) is a Burkinabé professional footballer who plays as a forward for Ukrainian Premier League club Shakhtar Donetsk and the Burkina Faso national team.

Club career

Rahimo
Traoré began his football career in the youth ranks of Rahimo FC in his hometown of Bobo-Dioulasso, Burkina Faso. He was scouted by Ajax and brought to South Africa, where was stalled at the clubs' satellite club Ajax Cape Town until he was old enough to legally transfer to Amsterdam.

Ajax Cape Town
Shortly after his 18th birthday, Traoré moved to Europe joining Ajax in January 2019, on a three and a half year contract. He had previously played for Rahimo in Burkina Faso and was on the books of Ajax Cape Town in South Africa where he finished as top scorer of the reserves team before departing for the Netherlands.

Ajax
Traoré was named on the bench for the first time in Ajax's fateful second leg defeat to Tottenham Hotspur in the semi-finals of the UEFA Champions League on 8 May 2019, before making his debut in the final seconds of their 4–1 win over Utrecht in the league four days later. He would have to wait over five months for his next first-team appearance as a late substitute in a 4–0 win against Feyenoord on 27 October 2019.

On 24 October 2020, Traoré scored five goals and assisted a further three in a record-breaking 13–0 league victory over VVV-Venlo. Three days later, Traoré earned a penalty-kick and scored his first goal in European competition in a 2–2 draw away to Atalanta in the group stage of the UEFA Champions League.

Shakhtar Donetsk
On 18 June 2021, it was announced that Traoré had joined Ukrainian Premier League side Shakhtar Donetsk for a fee of €10 million. On 22 September, Traoré scored twice in Shakhtar's 3–0 win against rivals Dynamo Kyiv in the 2021 Ukrainian Super Cup.

International career
Traoré made his international debut for Burkina Faso on 4 May 2017, during a friendly match against Benin.

Playing style 
Lassina Traoré is not remarkably tall at 1.83 m, but his muscularity makes him well suited for a physical playing style. As a team player, he is technically competent beyond being a typical ‘target man’.

Personal life
Traoré's mother was a former professional footballer and captained the Burkina Faso women's national football team. His cousin, Bertrand Traoré, is also a professional footballer, who plays as a right winger for Aston Villa.

Career statistics

Club

International

Scores and results list Burkina Faso's goal tally first, score column indicates score after each Traoré goal.

Honours
Ajax
 Eredivisie: 2018–19, 2020–21
 KNVB Cup: 2018–19, 2020–21

Shakhtar Donetsk
 Ukrainian Super Cup: 2021

Individual
 Eredivisie Player of the Month: October 2020

References

External links

Living people
2001 births
People from Bobo-Dioulasso
Burkinabé footballers
Association football forwards
Burkina Faso international footballers
Ukrainian Premier League players
Eredivisie players
Eerste Divisie players
Rahimo FC players
Cape Town Spurs F.C. players
AFC Ajax players
Jong Ajax players
FC Shakhtar Donetsk players
Burkinabé expatriate footballers
Burkinabé expatriate sportspeople in the Netherlands
Expatriate footballers in the Netherlands
Burkinabé expatriate sportspeople in South Africa
Expatriate soccer players in South Africa
Expatriate footballers in Ukraine
Burkinabé expatriate sportspeople in Ukraine
21st-century Burkinabé people